Viktor Nemeš (born 21 July 1993) is a Serbian Greco-Roman wrestler. His twin brother Mate Nemeš is also a wrestler.

Biography
Nemeš represented Serbia at the first ever European Games and was the first competitor for Serbia to win a medal at the 2015 European Games when he won his silver medal, losing to the Azerbaijani Elvin Mursaliyev.

Nemeš won a silver medal at the 2016 Riga European Championships in March. He also represented Serbia at the 2016 Summer Olympics in Rio de Janeiro, Brasil but he lost in the quarterfinals to the eventual silver medallist Mark Madsen of Denmark. 

At the 2017 World Wrestling Championships in Paris, Nemeš edged the 2016 Summer Olympics bronze medallist Saeid Abdevali of Iran in the opening round and later defeated the Russian wrestler Aleksandr Chekhirkin in the gold medal final, with a score of 4-1. This triumph brought him his first world medal and Nemeš became the second world wrestling champion from the independent Serbia, after Davor Štefanek's world title in 2014.

Nemeš won his second European silver medal at the 2018 European Wrestling Championships in Russia. He faced the two-time Olympic champion and home favourite Roman Vlasov in the final, where he eventually lost 1-5. At the 2018 World Wrestling Championships in Budapest, Nemeš met Chekhirkin again in the third round. But this time, in the rematch of the last year's final, Nemeš lost to Chekhirkin 1-2. He later went on winning in repechage rounds and the bronze medal match to claim his second senior world medal.

At the 2019 Euros in Romania, Nemeš lost to the defending champion Roman Vlasov but later went on winning a bronze medal.  In 2020, he won one of the bronze medals in the 77 kg event at the 2020 Individual Wrestling World Cup held in Belgrade, Serbia. In March 2021, he competed at the European Qualification Tournament in Budapest, Hungary hoping to qualify for the 2020 Summer Olympics in Tokyo, Japan.

In 2022, he competed in the 77 kg event at the European Wrestling Championships in Budapest, Hungary where he was eliminated in his first match. He competed in the 77kg event at the 2022 World Wrestling Championships held in Belgrade, Serbia.

References

External links

 

1993 births
Living people
Serbian male sport wrestlers
Olympic wrestlers of Serbia
Wrestlers at the 2016 Summer Olympics
People from Senta
Hungarians in Vojvodina
European Games silver medalists for Serbia
World Wrestling Championships medalists
European Games medalists in wrestling
European Wrestling Championships medalists
Competitors at the 2022 Mediterranean Games
Mediterranean Games medalists in wrestling
Mediterranean Games gold medalists for Serbia
20th-century Serbian people
21st-century Serbian people